Paias Wingti (born 2 February 1951) is a Papua New Guinean politician. He served as the third Prime Minister of Papua New Guinea between 1985 and 1988, and again from 1992 to 1994.

Early life and education
Wingti hails from the Jika Tribe of the Western Highlands province, and was born in Moika village, near Mount Hagen. He did not go to school until the age of 10, but was later educated at Mount Hagen High School. He enrolled at the University of Papua New Guinea in Port Moresby in 1974, and first visited Australia as an Australian Union of Students delegate for the UPNG Student Representative Council. While doing his final year in Economics at university, he contested the 1977 election, and won the Hagen Open seat, joining Michael Somare's Pangu Party.

Political career
He served as Minister for Civil Aviation from 1978 until the defeat of the first Somare government in 1980, and when Somare returned to power in 1982, became Deputy Prime Minister. He split with the Pangu Party in 1985 and formed the People's Democratic Movement, becoming Leader of the Opposition. In November 1985, he moved a successful no-confidence vote against the Somare government and became the third Prime Minister of Papua New Guinea aged 34. Julius Chan, the second Prime Minister, served as Wingti's deputy. He was made a Privy Councillor in 1987.

He remained in power after the 1987 election after corralling a slender majority of three votes. He announced a more independent foreign policy, attempting to enhance relations with the Soviet Union, U.S., Japan and China. He lost a motion of confidence in July 1988 with changes in the shifting coalition and was succeeded by Rabbie Namaliu, the new leader of the Pangu Party, but Wingti returned for a further two-year stint in 1992. His second term was marked by an escalation of unrest in Bougainville and he was ousted by Julius Chan in August 1994. Wingti continued to represent the Western Highlands in the National Parliament of Papua New Guinea, although he switched from the local Hagen constituency to the provincial-level electorate in 1995.

Wingti served as the governor of Western Highlands Province from 1995 to 1997, when he was defeated for re-election by Father Robert Lak. He returned to parliament in 2002, defeating Lak to regain his seat and the governorship. He subsequently won back the leadership of the People's Democratic Movement from Mekere Morauta, who had taken over after his defeat, in 2007. However, he was defeated in his bid for re-election at the 2007 election, losing to former student activist Tom Olga, largely as a result of the new preferential voting system.. Wingti, along with fellow former Prime Minister Rabbie Namaliu, were the most high-profile losers of the election. Additionally, Wingti lost the governorship of West Highlands Province to Olga. The PDM also suffered a major defeat in the election, losing several seats. He nominated to contest the July 2012 general elections and defeated Tom Olga by 112640 votes to 89195, a difference of 23445 votes and elected Governor of Western Highlands Province. He was one of the three former Prime Ministers who backed Peter O'Neil to be retained as Prime Minister of Papua New Guinea at Parliament House on August 3, 2012.

References

1951 births
Living people
Prime Ministers of Papua New Guinea
Governors of Western Highlands Province
Members of the National Parliament of Papua New Guinea
Members of the Privy Council of the United Kingdom
People from the Western Highlands Province
People's Democratic Movement politicians
20th-century Papua New Guinean politicians